Crymlyn may refer to:
Crymlyn Bog, a nature reserve near Swansea, Wales, U.K.
Crymlyn Burrows, an area of land in Wales, UK

See also
Cremlyn, Biwmares, Ynys Môn, Wales, U.K.
Crumlin, Caerphilly, Caerphilly county borough, South Wales, U.K.